Ernesto Rivera (24 May 1914 – 23 November 1991) was a Puerto Rican sports shooter. He competed in the 25 m pistol event at the 1952 Summer Olympics.

References

1914 births
1991 deaths
People from Caguas, Puerto Rico
Puerto Rican male sport shooters
Olympic shooters of Puerto Rico
Shooters at the 1952 Summer Olympics
Pan American Games medalists in shooting
Pan American Games silver medalists for Puerto Rico
Shooters at the 1955 Pan American Games